Montefioralle is a village in Tuscany, a frazione of the comune of Greve in Chianti. It is sometimes claimed to be the birthplace of Amerigo Vespucci.

Geography
The village lies about a mile west of Greve.

History

Town and village were an important stronghold during the wars between Florence and Siena. In 1250 it became the headquarters of the League of the Greve Valley. The town was once endowed with two sets of walls. It had an octagonal shape with four gates. With the fall of the Sienese Republic, Montefioralle lost its prior importance and most of its inhabitants moved to Greve in Chianti.

The central church is currently undergoing renovations.

Notable residents
A house in the circular main street of Montefioralle is pointed out as the birthplace of Amerigo Vespucci. The doorway is identified by the wasp ("vespa") and V of the Vespucci family.

References

Frazioni of the Province of Florence